

Station List

C